Roads End may refer to:
Roads End, California, an unincorporated community
Roads End State Recreation Site, a state park in Oregon

See also
End of the Road (disambiguation)